Jon David Carder is an American businessman. He is the co-founder and CEO of Empyr, an (O2O) commerce company.

Undertaking
After selling Clientshop.com for $10 million, Carder co-founded Mogl, a reward program concentrating on restaurants using card linked offer technology.

References

Year of birth missing (living people)
Living people
American chief executives